Paranaleptes giraffa is a species of beetle in the family Cerambycidae. It was described by Kiresch in 1924.

References

Ceroplesini
Beetles described in 1924